Yemen Olympic Committee (IOC code: YEM) is the National Olympic Committee representing Yemen. It was created in 1974 and formally recognized by the IOC in 1981.

References

External links 
Yemen Olympic Committee

Yemen
Oly
Yemen at the Olympics
1971 establishments in Yemen
Sports organizations established in 1971